Park In-deok (September 24, 1896 – April 3, 1980) was a Korean independence activist, educator, writer, poet and a social activist. She used the penname of Eunbong (은봉, 銀峰).

Park Indeok belongs to the first generation of Korean female writers, all of whom were born around 1900.

She lectured in the United States and Canada in 1936, established a vocational school, and tried to convert Koreans to Christianity.

See also 
 Na Hye-sok
 Kim Hwallan
 Hwang Jini
 Shin Saimdang
 Heo Nanseolheon
 Yu Gam-dong

References

External links 
 Park Indeok:Korean historical person information 
 조선의 ‘노라’ 박인덕 이혼사건 
 1896년 원숭이 해 구월 달에 태어난 
 Park Indeok 

1896 births
1980 deaths
Korean independence activists
Korean religious leaders
Korean women poets
Korean novelists
Korean fantasy writers
Mythopoeic writers
Korean revolutionaries
Korean writers
Korean educators
Korean scholars
20th-century Korean women
South Korean feminists
South Korean journalists
South Korean women journalists
South Korean anti-communists
Proponents of Christian feminism
Korean Christian missionaries
Sex-positive feminists
20th-century Korean poets
20th-century novelists
20th-century Korean women writers
20th-century Korean writers
20th-century journalists